Jade Tierney (born 18 April 2004) is a Cook Island canoeist. She competed in the women's K-1 200 metres  event at the 2020 Summer Olympics.

References

External links
 

Living people
Cook Island female canoeists
Canoeists at the 2020 Summer Olympics
Olympic canoeists of the Cook Islands
2004 births